Pranpur Assembly constituency is an assembly constituency in Katihar district in the Indian state of Bihar. Nisha Singh of Bharatiya Janata Party is the current Member of Legislative Assembly since 2020.

Overview
As per Delimitation of Parliamentary and Assembly constituencies Order, 2008, No 66. Pranpur Assembly constituency is composed of the following: Pranpur and Azamnagar community development blocks.

Pranpur Assembly constituency is part of No 11 Katihar (Lok Sabha constituency).

Members of Legislative Assembly

Election results

2020

References

External links
 

Assembly constituencies of Bihar
Politics of Katihar district